Boron Aluminum Titanium Hydride (BATH) was developed as a radiation shielding material in the NERVA project for space nuclear thermal propulsion applications.

References 

Space science